Franck Chaumin (born 2 November 1969) is a French former footballer.

Career statistics

Club

Notes

Honours
Individual
Toulon Tournament Best Goalkeeper: 1989

References

1969 births
Living people
French footballers
France youth international footballers
France under-21 international footballers
Association football goalkeepers
Championnat National players
Ligue 2 players
INF Clairefontaine players
Quimper Kerfeunteun F.C. players
Gazélec Ajaccio players
FC Sochaux-Montbéliard players
FC Mulhouse players
French expatriate sportspeople in Mali
Sportspeople from Blois
Footballers from Centre-Val de Loire